Adnan Hrelja (born 10 October 1993) is a Bosnian-Herzegovinian footballer who currently plays for Igman Konjic.

References
HLSZ 

1993 births
Living people
Footballers from Sarajevo
Association football fullbacks
Bosnia and Herzegovina footballers
Bosnia and Herzegovina youth international footballers
Pécsi MFC players
FK Sarajevo players
FK Rudar Kakanj players
FK Mladost Doboj Kakanj players
NK Bosna Visoko players
Nemzeti Bajnokság I players
Premier League of Bosnia and Herzegovina players
First League of the Federation of Bosnia and Herzegovina players
Bosnia and Herzegovina expatriate footballers
Expatriate footballers in Hungary
Bosnia and Herzegovina expatriate sportspeople in Hungary